Leekes is a Welsh based retailer of home furnishings, home improvement goods and related items. The company was established in the Rhondda in 1897 and has six department stores in South Wales, South West England and the Midlands. The company also owns the Vale Resort in the Vale of Glamorgan and the adjacent Hensol Castle, a conference and wedding venue.

History
James Henry Leeke established Leekes as a blacksmith in Tonypandy in the Rhondda Valley, Wales in 1897.  He operated a smithy for sharpening tools at the rear of the family home, a small terraced house in Clydach Vale, and then opened a small ironmongery business in the front room.

The Leekes business survived the following two decades intact and James' son Llewellyn took over the business from his father in 1933 at the age of 22.  In 1948 Llewellyn bought a larger shop in Dunraven Street, Tonypandy; at this time the ironmonger and builders merchant was operated almost entirely by the family.

In the late 1960s, Llewellyn’s son Gerald joined the business full-time, extended the range at Dunraven Street and added kitchen and bathrooms displays, taking over the shop next door for an additional showroom.  In 1965 the company turnover had reached £38,000 and the former goods station in Trealaw, Rhondda was acquired for expansion, combining the retail premises and builders yard with some car parking.

Leekes bought another Rhondda site in Talbot Green near Llantrisant and opened a store in 1977, described as a "DIY superstore".

In 2007 the eldest son of Llewellyn, David Leeke, wrote an account of the development of the Welsh business from the boom in the coal industry, through the Depression and two World Wars to the 21st century.

In 2009 Leekes bought out Midlands-based Cole's Home Furnishing, adding three stores in England: at Bilston near Wolverhampton, Bedworth near Coventry, and Fenton in Stoke-on-Trent. The Coventry store was sold in 2018.

Leekes bought Park Furnishers (Bristol) Limited in 2016, a family-run business with a furniture store in Bedminster, Bristol.

Operations
Leekes remains a family business with many family members from the fourth generation. There are department stores in Wales at Cross Hands and Llantrisant, and a builders' merchant at Tonypandy. Stores in England are at Bilston, Hereford and Melksham (Wiltshire), together with showrooms for conservatories and windows at Thornbury (Gloucestershire) and Swindon. In addition, the Park Furnishers store in Bedminster continues to trade under its own name.

Each Leekes department store is divided into the following departments: Cabinet Furniture, Upholstery, Bedroom Furniture, Kitchen Furniture, Sound and Vision, Kitchen Appliances, Kitchen and Tableware, Home Accessories, Gifts, Fitted Bathrooms, Bathroom Accessories, Fitted Kitchens, Conservatories, Interior Design Studio, Fire Studio, Fitness Equipment & Leisure, DIY, Garden Living, Building Centre, Fitted Carpets, Decorating and Home Textiles.

Structure
The business was restructured in 2005 as a group of companies. Each of the trading companies, including the retailer Leekes Limited, is a wholly owned subsidiary of J.H. Leeke and Sons Limited.

The Vale Resort

In 1994, Leekes Retail and Leisure Group took ownership of a golf club in Hensol in the Vale of Glamorgan. This marked the start of diversification of the business into the leisure industry. The company then built and developed The Vale Resort, trading since 1999 as Vale of Glamorgan Hotel Limited.

Hensol Castle

In 2003, the company purchased the Hensol Castle estate that adjoins the Vale resort. The estate includes a 17th-century stately home, an historically important mid-18th century landscaped park, a  lake and serpentine pond. The castle is operated by Leekes Group Property Developments Limited as a conference centre and wedding venue.

References
Leeke, David (2007). An Iron Monger's Tale. Llandysul: Gomer Press.

External links

Leekes windows & conservatories

Retail companies established in 1897
Retail companies of Wales
Furniture retailers of the United Kingdom
1897 establishments in Wales
Companies based in Rhondda Cynon Taf